Pataugas (French: splasher) is both a shoe and a brand created on 24 August 1950 by René Elissabid, an industrialist from Mauleon, a village in the province of Soule, France.

The shoe is more a boot, with a rubbered thick lugged outsole obtained with pulp rubber heated with a gas stove, hence the name "pataugas."

It was the preferred shoe of generations of scouts, soldiers and hikers of all kinds, including earth tones of the various models are a sign of authenticity.

The Pataugas brand is owned today by Hopps Group. The acquisition of Pataugas was a milestone in the strategy of the manufacturer, since Pataugas is once more fashionable and manages to attract a wider audience.

The French Shoe company Palladium makes a similar shoe/boot

References

External links
 Pataugas official page
 Vivarte official page

Shoes
Athletic shoe brands